Kamran Khan (born 10 March 1991) is an Indian cricketer who bowls left-arm fast-medium. He played in the Indian Premier League for Rajasthan Royals and later Pune Warriors, and represented Uttar Pradesh and Colts at domestic level. Playing for RR along with KKR's Ajantha Mendis he bowled the first ever super over in the history of the IPL.

Having impressed Darren Berry, the Rajasthan director of coaching, in a suburban Twenty20 tournament, Khan was given a contract worth about $24,000 with Rajasthan for the second season of the IPL. He made his T20 debut before having played a first-class match.

The son of a woodcutter, Khan has struggled with poverty. Telling of how he would travel to trials, he said "Be it Lucknow or Kanpur, I used to sleep at platforms. I used to buy a platform ticket and spend the night there ... I always had monetary problems. I never dared to ask money from my brothers. I had one pair of white clothes for trials". Shane Warne, the Rajasthan captain, described Khan as "a young kid, a left-armer, a slinger ... He's a tiny little guy but he bowls 140 km/h plus". The Pune Warriors India joined the IPL for its 2011 season and recruited Khan after two seasons with Rajasthan; however, he only played one match for Pune.

Nearly two years after his last twenty20 match, Khan made his first-class debut for Colts Cricket Club in March 2013.

References

External links
 Cricinfo player profile

Indian cricketers
Rajasthan Royals cricketers
Pune Warriors India cricketers
Colts Cricket Club cricketers
Uttar Pradesh cricketers
1991 births
Living people